The Clio Depot is a former railroad depot located at 300-308 West Vienna Road in Clio, Michigan. It was listed on the National Register of Historic Places in 1983. The building has been converted into the Clio Depot and Museum.

History
In 1861, the Pere Marquette Railway constructed a line through Clio to Flint (now the CSX Saginaw Subdivision) . The depot in Clio was constructed in 1873 to service the line. The building was used by the railroad until 1960. After its use as a depot was discontinued, it spent some time as a laundromat. The building was purchased by the Clio Area Historic Association in 1977, and was renovated in the 1980s to turn into a museum.

Description
The Clio Depot is a one-story vernacular frame structure clad with clapboard. The building is rectangular and has a gable roof. Decoration is minimal, confined to the pedimented hoods located above the windows and doors.

References

External links

Clio Depot at Michmarkers.com
Clio Depot at MichiganRailroads.com

		
National Register of Historic Places in Genesee County, Michigan
Buildings and structures completed in 1823